Daniel Gygax (born 28 August 1981) is a Swiss former professional footballer who played as a midfielder. Gygax earned 35 caps for the Swiss national team, playing at two European Championships and the 2006 FIFA World Cup.

Career
Gygax was born in Zürich.

On 7 July 2008, Gygax moved to 1. FC Nürnberg in Germany. He left the team on 30 June 2010 to join FC Luzern. Gygax along with another signing Hakan Yakin has helped their team to a surprise lead in the Swiss Super League with half of the season gone. He scored seven goals during the season.

Gygax retired at the end of the 2016–17 season, aged 35.

International career
Gygax made his debut for the Swiss national team on 31 March 2004, replacing Hakan Yakin after 60 minutes of a 1–0 friendly loss to Greece in Heraklion. He scored his first goal on his fourth cap, the only goal in a friendly win over Liechtenstein on 6 June. At Euro 2004, he played in Switzerland's last two group games, and he also played the first two group games at the 2006 FIFA World Cup. His last of 35 internationals was on 11 June 2008, as a late substitute in a group game against Turkey at Euro 2008 which the Swiss co-hosted.

International goals
Source:

|-
| 1. || 6 June 2004 || Hardturm, Zürich, Switzerland ||  || 1–0 || 1–0 || Friendly
|-
| 2. || 9 February 2005 || Maktoum Bin Rashid Al Maktoum Stadium, Dubai, United Arab Emirates ||  || 1–0 || 2–1 || Friendly
|-
| 3. || 7 September 2005 || GSP Stadium, Strovolos, Cyprus ||  || 3–1 || 3–1 || 2006 FIFA World Cup qualification
|-
| 4. || 1 March 2006 || Hampden Park, Glasgow, Scotland ||  || 2–0 || 3–1 || Friendly
|-
| 5. || 31 May 2006 || Stade de Genève, Lancy, Switzerland ||  || 1–1 || 1–1 || Friendly
|}

Honours
FC Zürich
Swiss Cup: 2004–05

References

External links
 Daniel Gygax at FC Luzern 
 
 Daniel Gygax at Eurosport

1981 births
Living people
Footballers from Zürich
Association football wingers
Association football forwards
Swiss men's footballers
Swiss expatriate footballers
Switzerland international footballers
Switzerland under-21 international footballers
UEFA Euro 2004 players
2006 FIFA World Cup players
UEFA Euro 2008 players
FC Baden players
FC Zürich players
FC Winterthur players
FC Aarau players
Swiss Super League players
Swiss Challenge League players
Ligue 1 players
Bundesliga players
2. Bundesliga players
Lille OSC players
FC Metz players
1. FC Nürnberg players
Expatriate footballers in France
Expatriate footballers in Germany
Swiss-German people